Folke Adamsson (1911–1977) was a Swedish football player and manager. He represented Hammarby IF during his whole playing career and later went on to coach the club for 18 years, as the longest-serving manager in its history.

Club career
He grew up in Fagersta and started to play youth football with local club Fagersta AIK. In 1931, at age 19, Adamsson moved to Hammarby IF in Stockholm.

Between 1931 and 1943, Adamsson made 187 league appearances for Hammarby, mostly in the Swedish second tier. In 1940, Hammarby played one season in Allsvenskan, the domestic top league, but was relegated immediately.

In 1943, Adamsson retired from playing due to a persistent knee injury.

Managerial career

After his playing career, Adamsson was the coach of Huvudsta IS and Hagalunds IS.

In 1946–47, Hammarby finished last in Division 2, and got relegated to Division 4 due to a restructuring of the Swedish league system. The next season, Adamsson took over as head coach of Hammarby, replacing Sven Bergqvist. The economy had collapsed and the club's entire existence was now threatened. Up on his return to Hammarby, Adamsson said:

Adamsson would, together with team manager Lennart Nyman, lead Hammarby IF from Division 4 back to Allsvenskan in just six seasons. The duo is credited with implementing a sense of work ethic and professionalism in the club. In the 1953–1954 season, the second tier was won without a single loss, whilst using only 15 players.

Hammarby went on to compete in Allsvenskan during the majority of Adamsson's stint at the club, before he decided to step down as manager at the end of 1965, being replaced by Georg Kraemer.

Other sports
In 1939, Adamsson was part of the first squad as Hammarby established a handball section.

References

Works cited

 

1911 births
1977 deaths
Association football midfielders
Swedish football managers
Hammarby Fotboll managers
Hammarby Fotboll players
Swedish men's footballers
People from Fagersta Municipality
Allsvenskan players
Sportspeople from Västmanland County